Klik Indonesia (Click Indonesia) is an Indonesian flagship television news program broadcast by TVRI on its main channel. The newscast was first broadcast on August 3, 2020, slightly changing its name from the previous name Indonesia. The program airs in the morning (as Klik Indonesia Pagi), at noon (as Klik Indonesia Siang), the evening (as Klik Indonesia Petang) and at midnight (as  Klik Indonesia Malam).

Klik Indonesia is a continuation of TVRI's main news program that started in the 1960s, by the flagship names Berita, Warta, and Indonesia.

International broadcast 
One of Klik Indonesia programs is aired by Australian channel SBS WorldWatch.

References 

Indonesian television news shows
2020 Indonesian television series debuts
2020s Indonesian television series
TVRI original programming